Amity is an unincorporated community in Montgomery County in the U.S. state of Ohio.

History
Amity was platted in 1840. A post office was established at Amity in 1879 and remained in operation until 1902.

References

Unincorporated communities in Montgomery County, Ohio
Unincorporated communities in Ohio